American neopaganism may refer to:
Neopaganism in the United States
Ásatrú in the United States
Heathenry in Canada